Panticeu is a commune in the northern part of Cluj County, Transylvania, Romania. It is composed of five villages: Cătălina (Szentkatolnadorna), Cubleșu Someșan (Magyarköblös), Dârja (Magyarderzse), Panticeu and Sărata (Szótelke).

Demographics 
According to the census from 2002 there was a total population of 2,001 people living in this commune. Of this population, 85.25% are ethnic Romanians,  10.49% ethnic Romani and 4.19% are ethnic Hungarians.

Natives
Iuliu Hațieganu

References

Atlasul localităților județului Cluj (Cluj County Localities Atlas), Suncart Publishing House, Cluj-Napoca, 

Communes in Cluj County
Localities in Transylvania